Tommy Roberts (1927 – 2001) was an English footballer, who played as a full back in the Football League for Blackburn Rovers, Watford and Chester.

References

Chester City F.C. players
Watford F.C. players
Skelmersdale United F.C. players
Association football fullbacks
English Football League players
Blackburn Rovers F.C. players
1927 births
2001 deaths
Footballers from Liverpool
English footballers